The Webster's test is a qualitative urine test used to detect the presence of trinitrotoluene and its metabolites.  The test was developed in 1917 by T.A. Webster in London as a way to test for trinitrotoluene poisoning.  A positive test results in a purple color for the acidified urine samples.

References 

Urine tests
Toxicology